Unsong or variation, may refer to:

 Unsong (novel), a science fiction novel by Slate Star Codex blog writer Scott Alexander
 Eun-sung, using McCune–Reischauer romanization; a Korean given name
 Unsongs (album), a 2016 album by Moddi
 "Unsong" (song), a 2000 song by 'Shriekback' off the album Naked Apes and Pond Life
 Tonsan station, a North Korean tratin station on the Kŭmgol Line, formerly named "Unsong"
 Unsong station, a North Korean train station on the Hambuk Line at the Unsŏng Mines
 Unsong station, a North Korean train station on the Manpo Line at the Unsong Colliery on the Changja River
 Unsong District, Chonchon County, Chagang Province, North Korea
 Unsong Ward, Hungnam District, Hamhung City, South Hamgyŏng Province, North Korea
 Unsong Village, Hwangju County, North Hwanghae Province, North Korea
 Unsong Village, Anju City, South P'yŏngan Province, North Korea

See also

 Unsung (disambiguation)
 Song (disambiguation)
 Un (disambiguation)